The Men's 100 metres T13 event for the 2000 Summer Paralympics took place at the Stadium Australia.

The T13 category is for athletes with a moderate visual impairment. Athletes in this category have a variety of visual impairments, but can typically recognize contours from a distance of 2 to 6 metres. Athletes in this category do not typically require a guide.

Results

Semi-finals 
Athletes qualified for the final if they finished in the top 3 in their race, or achieved one of the next 2 fastest times.

Heat 1

Heat 2

Final

References 
 

Athletics at the 2000 Summer Paralympics